UFC 114: Rampage vs. Evans was a mixed martial arts event held by the Ultimate Fighting Championship on May 29, 2010 at the MGM Grand Garden Arena in Las Vegas, Nevada. The UFC Fan Expo took place at the Mandalay Bay Convention Center.

Background
Spike TV once again broadcast two live preliminary bouts one hour before the PPV broadcast began. In addition, the three-part UFC Primetime series returned to Spike TV in the build up for this event.

The full fight card featured five Ultimate Fighter season champions (Rashad Evans, Michael Bisping, Diego Sanchez, Amir Sadollah and Efrain Escudero), making it just the second UFC event (after The Ultimate Fighter: United States vs. United Kingdom Finale the previous year) to feature 5 TUF champions. Another Ultimate Fighter winner, Forrest Griffin, was also scheduled to compete at this event, but had to pull out due to injury.

A bout between Forrest Griffin and Antônio Rogério Nogueira was scheduled for this event, however Griffin withdrew due to a shoulder injury. Griffin was replaced by Jason Brilz.

Melvin Guillard was scheduled to face Thiago Tavares, but Tavares was forced off the card with an elbow injury. Waylon Lowe then stepped in as Tavares' replacement.

UFC President Dana White confirmed that the winner between Jackson vs. Evans would fight UFC Light Heavyweight Champion Mauricio Rua for the title in their next bout, but it never took place after Rashad Evans (who won the UFC 114 main event) was injured and ultimately replaced by Jon Jones for the title match at UFC 128 in March 2011. Rua's manager had originally suggested he could see Rua's first title defense against Randy Couture, though that bout was not likely to occur.

Jackson was originally supposed to fight Evans for the title after defeating Keith Jardine at UFC 96 in March 2009, but a jaw injury during that fight allowed Lyoto Machida to replace him in the UFC 98 title fight, which Machida won. Jackson was then expected to fight for the title against Machida, but instead became a coach on The Ultimate Fighter: Heavyweights against Evans.

Results

Bonus awards
Fighters were awarded $65,000 bonuses.

Fight of the Night: Antônio Rogério Nogueira vs. Jason Brilz
Knockout of the Night: Mike Russow
Submission of the Night: Ryan Jensen

Reported payout
The following is the reported payout to the fighters as reported to the Nevada State Athletic Commission. It does not include sponsor money or "locker room" bonuses often given by the UFC and also do not include the UFC's traditional "fight night" bonuses.

Rashad Evans $410,000 ($185,000 win bonus) def. Quinton Jackson $250,000
Michael Bisping $325,000 ($150,000 win bonus) def. Dan Miller $15,000
Mike Russow $24,000 ($12,000 win bonus) def. Todd Duffee $8,000
Antônio Rogério Nogueira $120,000 ($40,000 win bonus) def. Jason Brilz $11,000
John Hathaway $22,000 ($11,000 win bonus) def. Diego Sanchez $50,000
Dong Hyun Kim $64,000 ($32,000 win bonus) def. Amir Sadollah $15,000
Efrain Escudero $30,000 ($15,000 win bonus) def. Dan Lauzon $15,000
Melvin Guillard $38,000 ($19,000 win bonus) def. Waylon Lowe $6,000
Cyrille Diabate $12,000 ($6,000 win bonus) def. Luiz Cane $19,000
Aaron Riley $20,000 ($10,000 win bonus) def. Joe Brammer $5,000
Ryan Jensen $16,000 ($8,000 win bonus) def. Jesse Forbes $6,000

See also
 Ultimate Fighting Championship
 List of UFC champions
 List of UFC events
 2010 in UFC

References

Ultimate Fighting Championship events
2010 in mixed martial arts
Mixed martial arts in Las Vegas
2010 in sports in Nevada
MGM Grand Garden Arena